Transgelin is a protein that in humans is encoded by the TAGLN gene.

The protein encoded by this gene is a transformation and shape-change sensitive actin cross-linking/gelling protein found in fibroblasts and smooth muscle. Its expression is down-regulated in many cell lines, and this down-regulation may be an early and sensitive marker for the onset of transformation. A functional role of this protein is unclear. Two transcript variants encoding the same protein have been found for this gene.

References

Further reading